GoBingo is a Philippine television game show broadcast by GMA Network. Hosted by Arnell Ignacio, it premiered on December 9, 1996 and concluded on January 1, 1999. The show returned on April 14, 2008 and concluded on October 10, 2008 with a total of 130 episodes.

History
GoBingo was initially aired from 1996 to 1999, hosted by Arnell Ignacio, with Maricar de Mesa as the first GobiGirl. Ignacio won the award for Best Game Show Host at the PMPC Star Awards for Television in 1997 for his role in GoBingo. After airing for 2 years, the show was replaced by a sportsfest-like gameshow, retitled as Golympics. The show recommenced in its original format on April 14, 2008 for a second run.

Format

1996-1999
Three contestants play with bingo cards (each with 15 numbered boxes) on 3 different screens. Every correct answer from a player randomly lights up one of their numbers. All the numbers that are lit count for home viewers, who play with bingo cards obtained in return for purchases of sponsors' products (obtained from assigned redemption centers).

In each round, there is a designated pattern to be created. In the first round, each correct answer highlights a number from the corners of the board. In the second round the pattern is a straight vertical line (center only), while the final round is the 'blackout' round.

If a home viewer gets all the 15 numbers for their card they win the home player jackpot (and the remaining unlit numbers in the studio screens change to diamonds).

The first studio player who completes their bingo card proceeds to the bonus round, which comprises 16 numbered boxes, each with a question. A correct answer causes the number to changes to a peso sign, an incorrect one to a blank. The object is to create a pattern of peso signs - horizontal, vertical, or diagonal - within the allotted time of 45 seconds.

2008

Ignacio reprised his role as host and the GobiGirls have so far been played by Joy Velasco (Miss Teen World 2007), Rain Larazabal (sister of Maureen Larazabal), Lyka Feliciano, Ria Christina Fariñas and twins KC and Bebs Hollmann. After three weeks, Krissa Mae Arrieta (Miss USA-Philippines 2007 Expo) became the permanent GobiGirl.

The GoBingo home bingo cards are now replaced by scratch cards, and the number of sponsors for the new season is down to 7 (from 10–12 in the first season). For the home viewer, proofs of purchase from Mercury Drug stores nationwide are exchanged for GoBingo scratch cards, according to size of purchase.

The bonus round bingo cards now have 25 boxes instead of 16.

A new bonus game (to win a new car, after the contestant has won the first bonus round) requires the contestant to uncover nine GoBingo logos without uncovering three images of sad faces. Contestants who fail still retain previously won prize money, and win an extra 1,000 pesos for every GoBingo logo uncovered before the third sad face.

The 1,000,000 Pesos GOMillion Edition
A bonus of 1,000,000 pesos (added to the usual jackpot of 150,000 pesos) is won by any player who can complete the blackout round, or complete their 15 numbers, from the first 18 numbers called.

Accolades

References

1996 Philippine television series debuts
1999 Philippine television series endings
2008 Philippine television series debuts
2008 Philippine television series endings
Filipino-language television shows
GMA Network original programming
Philippine game shows